The Kunapa  are a clan of Indigenous Australian families of Central Australia who traditionally lived to the north of Tennant Creek, Northern Territory.

Language
The Kunapa speak a Warumungu dialect.

Country
The Kunapa's traditional lands lie on the Western Barkly Tablelands of Central Australia, and include territory in the areas of the Banka Banka, Brunchilly, and Elroy Downs pastoral leases.

History
The Kunapa were alienated from their original homelands with the development of pastoralism. and subsequently were concentrated in towns like Tennant Creek. In the last decades two Kunapa communities, the Ngurrara and Kurnturlpara,  have been re-establishing outstations in houses they had once owned in the western areas of Barkly Tableland.

Destruction of a sacred site
The mining corporation, OM Manganese, was fined $150,000 in 2013 for having desecrated a site known as "Two Women Sitting Down" at the Bootu Creek Manganese Mine. The Kunapa are one of the traditional custodians of this area.

Native title
Kunapa land claims are represented by the Manungurra Aboriginal Corporation.

Notes

Citations

Sources

External links
 Manungurra Aboriginal Corporation

Aboriginal peoples of the Northern Territory